Mickaël Mazzoli (born 27 March 1987) is a Saint Martin international football midfielder last playing with FK Slavija in the Premier League of Bosnia and Herzegovina.

He has previously played with SO Châtellerault in French CFA Groupe D NEGRO (4th tier) during the 2007-08 season. He also played with Saint-Louis Stars in Saint Martin. Next season 2009/2010 he played with Paris FC French  third division He moved to Bosnia in summer 2011 to sign with top league club FK Slavija Sarajevo. In the season 2013–14 he played in Swiss fourth level with FC Monthey.

He is part of the Saint Martin national football team since 2006 and was part of the team at the 2010 Caribbean Championship.

References

External links
 

1987 births
Living people
Saint Martinois footballers
Saint Martin international footballers
Saint Martin expatriate footballers
Association football midfielders
FK Slavija Sarajevo players
Expatriate footballers in Bosnia and Herzegovina
FC Monthey players
Expatriate footballers in Switzerland